Hypleurochilus multifilis, the featherduster blenny, is a species of combtooth blenny found in the western Atlantic ocean, in the Gulf of Mexico around Texas, USA. Its distribution extends from central Florida to Tabasco, Mexico.

References

multifilis
Fish described in 1858